Ufumaland (Ana Uvume) is one of the 16 major towns that make up the geo-political area called Orumba North Local Government Area of Anambra State, Nigeria. Ufuma's geographical coordinates are 6° 5' 0" North, 7° 11' 0" East. Ufuma has three main Communities, Umuehi, Umunebonato, etc. Each Community harbors three villages. In Ufuma there are various Schools like Federal Polytechnic located at Oko Town and Ufuma Study Centre at Ozegu.

External links
www.kwenu.com
Ekpere Ufuma
Umuadas of Ufuma
Ufuma Town : LOCAL GOVERNMENT AREAS IN ANAMBRA STATE dated July 21, 2007; accessed February 26, 2009
Ufuma Community Bank

Towns in Anambra State